The Pirate Party of Ukraine is a political party in Ukraine.  Based on the model of the Swedish Pirate Party, it supports reform of copyright law, the abolition of patents, and respect for privacy. The party was not a founding member (in 2010) of Pirate Parties International but it joined them in April 2013. As of August 2013 the party is not officially registered as such by the Ukrainian Ministry of Justice.

In the 2012 parliamentary election the party supported independent candidate Tetyana Montyan in single-member district number 212 (first-past-the-post wins a parliament seat) located in Kyiv; she became fifth in this district with 9% of the votes.

The party did not participate in the 2014 Ukrainian parliamentary election.

In the 2019 Ukrainian parliamentary election the party had 1 candidates in constituency 95 located in Irpin, but he got only 0.15% of the votes (133 votes).

References

External links
 Official website

Ukraine
Political parties in Ukraine